World Tour may refer to:

Sports
International sports world tours and series
 IAAF Diamond League, Athletics
 BWF Super Series, Badminton
 FIVB Beach Volleyball World Tour, Beach volleyball
 World Tour (bodyboarding)
 Rugby sevens
IRB Sevens World Series, men
IRB Women's Sevens World Series
 ASP World Tour, Surfing
 Squash
PSA World Tour, men
WSA World Tour, women
World Junior Squash Circuit
 ITTF World Tour, Table tennis
 Tennis
ATP World Tour, men
WTA Tour, women
 FINA Swimming World Cup, Swimming
 UCI World Tour, the premier annual male elite road cycling tour
 World Tour (bodyboarding), the men's international bodyboarding tour, which started at 1994 and has undergone a few changes in names and regulations since

Music

Tours

 World Tour (Bananarama), the second concert tour by Bananarama, 1989
 World Tour (Mary J. Blige), Music Saved My Life Tour, eighth concert tour by Mary J. Blige, 2010–2011
 The Garth Brooks World Tour (disambiguation), multiple concert tours by Garth Brooks
 The World Tour, the co-headlining tour by Def Leppard and Mötley Crüe, 2023
 Pentatonix: The World Tour,  ninth concert tour by Pentatonix, 2019–present
 Happier Than Ever, The World Tour, sixth concert tour by Billie Eilish, 2022–2023
 Wonder: The World Tour, fifth concert tour by Shawn Mendes, 2022
 PTV/SWS World Tour, the co-headlining tour by Pierce the Veil and Sleeping with Sirens, 2014–2015

Albums
 World Tour, by Joe Zawinul, 1998
 World Tour E.P., by Echo and the Bunnymen, 1997

Songs
 "World Tour", by Wale featuring Jazmine Sullivan from the album Attention Deficit
 "World Tours", by the Game, formerly released with the album Drillmatic – Heart vs. Mind

See also
 Concert Tour
 Guitar Hero World Tour, a multi-platform music video game
 Mario Golf: World Tour, a Nintendo 3DS golf video game